William Adams (March 12, 1851 – July 1, 1936) was a farmer and political figure in British Columbia. He represented Cariboo in the Legislative Assembly of British Columbia from 1893 to 1898.

He was born in Dumfries Township, Ontario, the son of Scottish immigrants, and was educated there. In 1883, Adams married Charlotte McDonald. Adams was first elected to the assembly in an 1893 by-election held following the death of Ithiel Nason. He lived at Lightning Creek. Adams raised livestock. He owned Springfield Ranch, later selling it to his daughter and son-in-law. He died in Chilliwack in 1936.

References 

1851 births
1936 deaths
Independent MLAs in British Columbia
Politicians from the Regional Municipality of Waterloo